The Son of Dr. Jekyll is a 1951 American horror film directed by Seymour Friedman and starring Louis Hayward, Jody Lawrance and Alexander Knox. The film is a continuation of Robert Louis Stevenson's original classic 1886 novella Strange Case of Dr. Jekyll and Mr. Hyde.

Jack Pollexfen, the scriptwriter of this film, wrote and produced a sequel in the same vein, Daughter of Dr. Jekyll (1957), starring Gloria Talbott.

Plot
The film begins with a prologue set in 1860, where Mr. Hyde is chased down in the streets of London, after murdering his wife at their Soho flat. He escapes to the house of Dr. Jekyll, where he prepares the potion that will transform him back to the respected doctor. Unfortunately, the mob has already set the house ablaze. The flames drive Hyde to the top floor and in an attempt to leap to the ground, he meets his demise when he falls to the ground. As he dies, he changes back into Dr. Jekyll.

John Utterson and Dr. Lanyon (original characters from Stevenson's novel) mourn their unfortunate friend Dr. Jekyll, until Inspector Stoddard brings the two to the Soho flat, where Jekyll/Hyde has left an orphan behind. Utterson agrees to adopt the young Jekyll, since he and his wife have not succeeded in having children. Thirty years later, Edward Jekyll, now fiancé to Utterson's niece Lynn and a student of the Royal Academy of Sciences, is expelled from the academy because of his peculiar and unorthodox experiments. Edward is unaware that he is actually Henry Jekyll's son, and when he inherits the Jekyll mansion, Dr. Lanyon tells him his father's tragic story.

Edward and Lynn move to the old Jekyll mansion for the preparations of their marriage, and soon, Edward feels unwelcome by his neighbors. Discovering his father's laboratory, Edward convinces himself to work on his father's experiments in order to clear the family name. He hires Michaels, Dr. Jekyll's old assistant, and begins researching. Unfortunately, after Edward first tests the formula on himself, a Hyde-like man appears in the house and murders a number of people. Edward is charged for the murders and, thought insane, is transferred to Dr. Lanyon's sanitarium where the murders continue. Edward begins wondering if it is he who transforms into a murderer or someone else is trying to drive him to insanity.

It was shown clearly that Lanyon changed chemicals and his father's notebook to frame Edward and keep control of his estate.

Cast
 Louis Hayward as Edward Jekyll / Dr. Henry Jekyll and Mr. Hyde
 Jody Lawrance as Lynn Utterson
 Alexander Knox as Dr. Curtis Lanyon
 Lester Matthews as Sir John Utterson
 Gavin Muir as Richard Daniels, editor
 Paul Cavanagh as Insp. Stoddard
 Rhys Williams as Michaels, the butler

References

External links

 
 
  AFI

1950s English-language films
American historical horror films
1950s historical horror films
1950s science fiction horror films
1951 horror films
1951 films
Films based on horror novels
Dr. Jekyll and Mr. Hyde films
Mad scientist films
Columbia Pictures films
Films set in England
Films set in London
Films set in 1860
Films set in the 1890s
Films directed by Seymour Friedman
American sequel films
Films scored by Paul Sawtell
American black-and-white films
1950s American films